Veronica Harrigan is a Canadian rugby union player. She plays at Hooker for Canada and the Brantford Harlequins.

Rugby career 
Harrigan began her rugby career in Grade 9 at Medway High School. She made the Ontario 7s U18 team in Grade 10. She studied Sociology and Criminology at King's University College.

In 2017, She was selected in Canada's November Series against England.

Harrigan was named in the Canadian team that competed in the Pacific Four Series in New Zealand. She was called into the Canadian squad for the delayed 2021 Rugby World Cup as a late replacement for Laura Russell, who had been ruled out due to injury before the tournament began.

Suspension 
In 2022, Harrigan received a two-month suspension from World Rugby after testing positive for the banned substance spironolactone. The drug was administered by her family physician without obtaining a therapeutic use exemption, although the violation was deemed unintentional. She was cleared to play again on October 4.

References

External links 

 Veronica Harrigan at Canada Rugby

Living people
Year of birth missing (living people)
Female rugby union players
Canadian female rugby union players
Canada women's international rugby union players